Robert Lee Davidson (also known as RLee) is an American guitarist known for playing in the hardcore punk band Scream. Scream also featured Nirvana drummer and Foo Fighters frontman Dave Grohl on drums.  In the 80's Davidson gained recognition playing in the D.C. hardcore band Scream recording albums This Side Up, Banging The Drum, and No More Censorship. On December 28,1996 Davidson reunited for a show with Scream at The Black Cat in Washington, DC and recorded a live record on Torque Records.

Davidson later went on to play with The Drills in Los Angeles, California. In the summer of 1998 Davidson formed the short lived band Festival of Fools. In 1999 Davidson did a European tour with the Baltimore-based punk band Jakkpot in support for their album Lie! Cheat! 'N Steal!. He later formed the band God Is Dead. Davidson has done humanitarian work in East Africa with The Kenyan Relief Organization.

Personal life
Davidson is married and lives in Indian Rocks Beach, Florida.

References

Living people
Guitarists from Washington, D.C.
Guitarists from Florida
People from Pinellas County, Florida
Year of birth missing (living people)